Edmílson Paulo da Silva, or just Edmílson (born 16 April 1968) is a retired Brazilian footballer who played as a striker.

He is the father of Edmilson Junior Paulo da Silva, who was born in Liège while Edmílson Sr. played there.

References

1968 births
Living people
Brazilian footballers
Sport Club do Recife players
Sampaio Corrêa Futebol Clube players
R.F.C. Seraing (1904) players
Botafogo de Futebol e Regatas players
Standard Liège players
Apollon Limassol FC players
K.V. Oostende players
Botafogo Futebol Clube (PB) players
Association football forwards
Brazilian expatriate footballers
Belgian Pro League players
Expatriate footballers in Belgium
Brazilian expatriate sportspeople in Belgium
Expatriate footballers in Cyprus
Brazilian expatriate sportspeople in Cyprus